The Kingdom of Croatia was part of the lands of the Habsburg monarchy from 1527, following the Election in Cetin, and the Austrian Empire from 1804 to 1867. It was also a part of the Lands of the Hungarian Crown, but was subject to direct Imperial Austrian rule for significant periods of time, including its final years. Its capital was Zagreb.

The Kingdom of Croatia had large territorial losses in wars with the Ottoman Empire in the 16th century. Until the 18th century, the kingdom included only a small north-western part of present-day Croatia around Zagreb, and a small strip of coastland around Rijeka, that were not part of the Ottoman Empire or part of the Croatian Military Frontier. Between 1744 and 1868, the Kingdom of Croatia included a subordinate autonomous kingdom, the Kingdom of Slavonia. The territory of the Slavonian kingdom was recovered from the Ottoman Empire, and was subsequently part of the Military Frontier for a short period. In 1744, these territories were organized as the Kingdom of Slavonia and included within the Kingdom of Croatia as an autonomous part. In 1868, they were merged into the newly formed Kingdom of Croatia-Slavonia.

History and government

Habsburg rule 
Following the fall of the medieval Kingdom of Hungary at the Battle of Mohács, in 1527 the Croatian and Hungarian nobles needed to decide on a new king. The bulk of the Croatian nobility convened the Croatian Parliament in Cetin and chose to join the Habsburg monarchy under the Austrian king Ferdinand I von Habsburg. Some nobles dissented and supported John Zápolya, but the Habsburg option still prevailed in 1540, when John Zápolya died.

Territory recovered by the Austrians from the Ottoman Empire was formed in 1745 as the Kingdom of Slavonia, subordinate to the Croatian Kingdom. In 1804 the Habsburg monarchy became the Austrian Empire which annexed the Venetian Republic in 1814 and established the Kingdom of Dalmatia. After the Austro-Hungarian Compromise of 1867 (by which the Austrian Empire became the Austro-Hungarian Empire) and the Croatian–Hungarian Settlement of 1868, the Kingdom of Croatia and Kingdom of Slavonia were joined to create the Kingdom of Croatia-Slavonia within the Hungarian part of the Empire, while the Kingdom of Dalmatia remained a crown land in the Austrian part of the Empire.

Croatian-Ottoman Wars 
The change of leadership was far from a solution to the war with the Ottomans, in fact, the Ottoman Empire gradually expanded in the 16th century to include most of Slavonia, western Bosnia and Lika. In 1558, the parliaments of Croatia and Slavonia were united after many centuries into one. The centre of the Croatian state moved northward from coastal Dalmatia, as these lands were conquered by the Ottomans. The town of Zagreb gained importance, as did nearby Varaždin.

Taking advantage of the growing conflict between King Sigismund II of Poland and Emperor Maximilian II, Suleiman the Magnificent started his sixth raid of Hungary in 1565 with 100,000 troops. They successfully progressed northwards until 1566 when they took a small detour to capture the outpost of Siget which they failed to capture ten years previously. The small fort was defended by Count Nikola IV Zrinski and 2,300–3,000 men. They were able to hold their ground for a month, and decimated the Ottoman army before being wiped out themselves. This siege, now known as the Battle of Szigetvár, bought enough time to allow Austrian troops to regroup before the Ottomans could reach Vienna.

By orders of the king in 1553 and 1578, large areas of Croatia and Slavonia adjacent to the Ottoman Empire were carved out into the Military Frontier ( or ) and ruled directly from Vienna's military headquarters. Due to the dangerous proximity to the Ottoman armies, the area became rather deserted, so Austria encouraged the settlement of Serbs, Germans, Hungarians, Czechs, Slovaks and Rusyns/Ukrainians and other Slavs in the Military Frontier, creating an ethnic patchwork.
The negative effects of feudalism escalated in 1573 when the peasants in northern Croatia and Slovenia rebelled against their feudal lords over various injustices such as unreasonable taxation or abuse of women in the Croatian and Slovenian peasant revolt. Ambroz Matija Gubec and other leaders of the mutiny raised peasants to arms in over sixty fiefs throughout the country in January 1573, but their uprising was crushed by early February. Matija Gubec and thousands of others were publicly executed shortly thereafter, in a rather brutal manner in order to set an example for others.

After the Bihać fort finally fell to the army of the Bosnian vizier Hasan Pasha Predojević in 1592, only small parts of Croatia remained unconquered. The remaining  where around 400,000 inhabitants lived were referred to as the "remnants of remnants of the once great and renowned Kingdom of Croatia".

The Revived Croatia 

By 1699, the Ottoman Empire was driven out of Ottoman Hungary and Croatia, throughout the course of Great Turkish War, and Austria brought the empire back under central control.

The Enlightened Absolutism Period 

Croatia was one of the crown lands that supported Emperor Charles VI's Pragmatic Sanction of 1713 and supported Empress Maria Theresa in the War of the Austrian Succession of 1741–48 and the Croatian Parliament signed their own Pragmatic Sanction of 1712. Subsequently, the Empress made significant contributions to Croatian matters, by making several reforms in the administrative control of the Military Frontier, the feudal and tax system. In 1767 she founded the Croatian Royal Council as royal government of Croatia and Slavonia, with seat in Varaždin, later in Zagreb, presided by the ban, but it was abolished in 1779 when Croatia was relegated to just one seat in the governing council of Hungary (the Royal Hungarian Council of Lieutenancy, also known as the Hungarian Vice-regency Council, headed by the palatine), held by the ban of Croatia. The empress also gave the independent port of Rijeka to Croatia in 1776. However, she also ignored the Croatian Parliament.

Napoleonic Wars 

With the fall of the Venetian Republic in 1797, its possessions in eastern Adriatic mostly came under the authority of France which passed its rights to Austria the same year. Eight years later they were restored to France as the Illyrian Provinces, but won back to the Austrian crown by 1815.

19th century 

In the 19th century Croatian romantic nationalism emerged to counteract the non-violent but apparent Germanization and Magyarization. The Croatian national revival began in the 1830s with the Illyrian movement. The movement attracted a number of influential figures and produced some important advances in the Croatian language and culture. The champion of the Illyrian movement was Ljudevit Gaj who also reformed and standardized Croatian. The official language in Croatia was Latin until 1847 when it became Croatian.

By the 1840s, the movement had moved from cultural goals to resisting Hungarian political demands. By the royal order of January 11, 1843, originating from the chancellor Metternich, the use of the Illyrian name and insignia in public was forbidden. This deterred the movement's progress but it couldn't stop the changes in the society that had already started.

Springtime of Nations - 1848

In the revolutions of 1848 in the Austrian Empire, the Croatian Ban Jelačić cooperated with the Austrians in quenching the Hungarian Revolution of 1848 by leading a military campaign into Hungary, successful until the Battle of Pákozd. Despite this contribution, Croatia was later subject to Baron Alexander von Bach's absolutism as well as the Hungarian hegemony under ban Levin Rauch when the Empire was transformed into a dual monarchy of Austria-Hungary in 1867.

From 1848 to 1850 Croatia was governed by the Ban's Council appointed by the Ban and the Parliament or the Croatian-Slavonian Diet (in 1848 first Diet with the elected representatives was summoned). In 1850 the Ban's Council was transformed into Ban's Government which, after the introduction of the absolutism (31 December 1851), was under the direct control of the Austrian Imperial Government in Vienna. From 1854 to 1861 the Imperial-Royal Croatian-Slavonian Lieutenancy (presided by the ban) in Zagreb, under the Austrian Ministry of Interior, was the main governing body of the Croatian-Slavonian crown land. After the fall of Bach's absolutism (the October Diploma of 1860 and the February Patent of 1861), the Royal Croatian-Slavonian Court Chancellery in Vienna - from 1861 to 1862 "courtly (aulic) department for Croatia and Slavonia" (ministry) - and the Croatian-Slavonian-Dalmatian Royal Council of Lieutenancy (also known as the Croatian-Slavonian-Dalmatian Vice-regency Council, it was headed by the ban) in Zagreb were founded. These remained Croatian-Slavonian government until 1868.

Ban Jelačić had succeeded in the abolition of serfdom in Croatia, which eventually brought about massive changes in society: the power of the major landowners was reduced and arable land became increasingly subdivided, to the extent of risking famine. Many Croatians started emigrating to the New World countries in this period, a trend that would continue throughout the next hundred years and create a large Croatian diaspora.

The Illyrian movement was rather broad in scope, both nationalist and pan-Slavist. It would eventually develop into two major causes:
 a Croatian national cause aimed primarily at the unification and independence of the people of Croatia, headed by people like the parliamentarian Ante Starčević, who formed the Party of Rights in 1861
 a pan-South-Slavic, Yugoslav cause also oriented towards the integration of the neighboring South Slavic nations, organized through the People's Party, and headed by people like bishop Josip Juraj Strossmayer, who founded the Yugoslav Academy of Sciences and Arts in 1867 and re-founded the University of Zagreb in 1874.

Dual Monarchy Period 

The loss of Croatian domestic autonomy was rectified a year after the Austro-Hungarian Compromise of 1867, when in 1868 the Croatian–Hungarian Settlement was negotiated, which combined Croatia and Slavonia into the autonomous Kingdom of Croatia-Slavonia. With this agreement, the Kingdom of Croatia received autonomy in administrative, educational, religious and judicial affairs. However, the governor (ban) was still appointed by Hungary, 55% percent of all tax money went to Budapest, and Hungary had authority over the biggest sea port of Rijeka (something that was reportedly not part of the Settlement actually agreed upon).

Demographics

According to the 1802 data, the population of the Kingdom of Croatia included 400,000 (98.8%) Roman Catholics, 4,800 (1.2%) Eastern Orthodox Christians and 40 Protestants.

In 1840, a Hungarian statistician Fenyes Elek analyzed the ethnicity in the countries belonging to the Hungarian Crown. According to the data he collected and processed, 526,550 people lived in the Kingdom of Croatia, out of which 519,426 (98.64%) were Croats, 3,000 (0.56%) Germans, 2,900 (0.55%) Serbs and 1,037 (0.19%) Jews. Population data by counties:

Primorje County
 40,390 Croats
 2,000 Germans
 200 Hungarians
 105 Jews
 67 Greeks

Varaždin County
 130,678 Croats
 153 Serbs
 474 Jews

Zagreb County
 279,991 Croats
 1,000 Germans
 978 Serbs
 313 Jews

Križevci County
 68,367 Croats
 1,769 Serbs
 145 Jews

The first modern population census was conducted in 1857 and it recorded religion of the citizens. Population by religion in the counties of Kingdom of Croatia:

 592,702 Roman Catholics
 6,048 Eastern Orthodox
 2,511 Jews
 394 Lutherans
 24 Calvinists
 14 Unitarians
 4 Armenian Orthodox
 2 Armenian Catholic Church

Insignia
In 1848 the Kingdom of Croatia adopted a new official flag and coat of arms. The new flag was the Croatian tricolor of red, white, and blue, and it was to remain the symbol of Croatia up to the present day. The coat of arms adopted in 1848 was an amalgam of three coats of arms, one for Croatia, another for the Kingdom of Dalmatia, and another for the Kingdom of Slavonia. The Kingdom also used the name "Triune Kingdom of Croatia, Slavonia, and Dalmatia" during certain periods (though this was not recognized by the Empire). The Kingdom still controlled the Kingdom of Slavonia, but did not control the Kingdom of Dalmatia. In 1852 the imperial Austrian government, which never recognized the tricolor as official, banned its use, along with the coat of arms. Between 1852 and 1861 the Kingdom of Croatia used the red and white flag, and its old chequy coat of arms. The tricolor was used again after 1861 (October Diploma and February Patent) and became official after 1868.

See also 

 Bans of Croatia
 Croatian Military Frontier
 Croatian nobility
 History of Croatia
 Hundred Years' Croatian–Ottoman War
 Kingdom of Croatia (925–1102)
 Kingdom of Croatia-Slavonia
 Kingdom of Dalmatia
 Kingdom of Slavonia
 Kings of Croatia
 List of noble families of Croatia
 Turkish Croatia
 Twelve noble tribes of Croatia

References

External links 

Austrian Empire (grey) 
Map of military districts in the Austrian Empire
The Habsburgs began to regain Croatian crown lands from the end of the 17th century (Britannica website)
Croatian-Hungarian Compromise of 1868 (Britannica website)

Former countries in the Balkans
Croatia
Croatia under Habsburg rule
Croatia
Former countries
Lands of the Kingdom of Hungary (1867–1918)